Leningrad Cowboys Go America is a 1989 road movie by Finnish film director Aki Kaurismäki about the adventures of  the Leningrad Cowboys, an eccentric band that travels to the United States to become successful, and combines their brand of polka music with various American styles as they make their way to Mexico.

Plot
The Leningrad Cowboys, a band with foot-long quiff hairstyles and long Winklepicker shoes to match, live in the tundra. Their manager Vladimir tries to promote them, but nobody seems to like their music, except for the mute village idiot, Igor. They are encouraged to move to America, for people will "buy anything" there. They depart for New York, bringing with them a band member who had frozen the previous night while practicing outside. Igor, who was not invited to come with them, stows away in the plane's baggage hold.

They arrive at the CBGB bar in Manhattan. An agent first suggests they should play at Madison Square Garden or Yankee Stadium, but after hearing their music, offers them a gig at a wedding in Mexico instead. He also recommends that they change their musical style to rock and roll. They buy a used 1975 Cadillac Fleetwood 75 Limousine, strap the coffin carrying their frozen band member onto the roof and set off to earn their way through the Deep South, adapting their musical style to suit local tastes at each new location. All the while they are being driven on and exploited by Vladimir, who hoards the money, takes most of the food for himself and hides beer in the ice-filled coffin. Meanwhile, Igor follows the band by his own means of transportation. When he finally catches up with them, the band members have revolted against Vladimir and tied him up, but Igor frees him and becomes the band's road manager.

During the trip, the band spends time in jail, has their car engine stolen, causes a nightclub to close after playing an unsuccessful show, and reunites with a long-lost cousin whose singing earns them positive reception from the audience. They eventually make it to Mexico and perform their wedding gig, where Igor revives the thawing bass guitarist with a shot of tequila and joins the group on stage. Vladimir watches them play then wanders off, but the band finally finds success in Mexico, making the top ten.

Cast
Main actors:
Matti Pellonpää as Vladimir Kuzmin (manager)
Kari Väänänen as The Mute (Igor)
Jim Jarmusch as car salesman
Richard Boes as rock promoter
The Leningrad Cowboys (Sakke Jarvenpää, Heikki Keskinen, Sakari Kuosmanen, Puka Oinonen, Silu Seppälä, Mauri Sumén, Malto Valtonen, Pekka Virtanen) as themselves
Nicky Tesco as lost cousin

The film includes cameos by blues guitarist Duke Robillard and American rockabilly Hall of Famer Colonel Robert Morris with his wife Irene.

Production
The idea to create the Leningrad Cowboys as an absurd band came from Sleepy Sleepers members Sakke Järvenpää and Mato Valtonen, who asked Kaurismäki to direct a music video for them in 1986. Kaurismäki directed the short film Rocky VI (1986) and the Leningrad Cowboys videos Thru the Wire (1987) and L.A. Woman (1988), and then started work on Leningrad Cowboys Go America.

The film had a budget of 3,645,184 Finnish markka and received a grant of 400,000 markka from the Finnish Film Foundation.

Soundtrack

A soundtrack album was released in 1989.

Reception
The film was ranked #88 in Empire magazine's "The 100 Best Films Of World Cinema" in 2010. It also holds a 100% 'Fresh' rating on review site Rotten Tomatoes based on 5 reviews.

Sequels and home media 
Leningrad Cowboys Go America was followed five years later by a sequel, Leningrad Cowboys Meet Moses (1994) and a concert film Total Balalaika Show (1994). 
The film was reissued on DVD in October 2011, as part of the Criterion Collection's Eclipse series, paired with the other two Leningrad Cowboys films.

References

Footnotes

Bibliography

External links

 
 
 
 
 
 
 

1989 films
1980s comedy road movies
Finnish comedy films
Finnish rock music films
Swedish comedy films
1980s English-language films
English-language Finnish films
English-language Swedish films
Mockumentary films
Films set in Russia
Films set in New York City
Films set in Tennessee
Films set in Mississippi
Films set in Louisiana
Films set in Texas
Films set in Mexico
1989 independent films
Films directed by Aki Kaurismäki
1980s Swedish films
Foreign films set in the United States